The 2015 Rugby World Cup was the eighth Rugby World Cup, the quadrennial rugby union world championship. The tournament was hosted by England from 18 September to 31 October. Of the 20 countries competing in the World Cup in 2011, there was only one change: Uruguay replaced Russia. This was the first World Cup with no new teams to the tournament.

Reigning champions New Zealand won the cup and defended their title by defeating Australia in the final 34–17; South Africa defeated Argentina to take third place. This was the first Rugby World Cup where no Northern Hemisphere team got beyond the quarter-finals. New Zealand were the first team to retain their title and the first to win for a third time.

The highly contested match between Japan and South Africa on the opening weekend, in which Japan scored the winning try in the final minute, was widely considered the biggest upset in the history of rugby. Hosts England were eliminated at the pool stage, after defeats by Wales and Australia; this was the first time the knockout stage did not feature a host nation.

Host selection

Submission of interest
The International Rugby Board (IRB) requested that any member unions wishing to host this tournament or the 2019 Rugby World Cup should indicate their interest by 15 August 2008. This would be purely to indicate interest; no details had to be provided at this stage. A record 10 unions indicated formal interest in hosting the 2015 and/or the 2019 events: Australia, England, Ireland, Italy, Jamaica, Japan, Russia, Scotland, South Africa and Wales. Argentina had been reported in early 2008 as having given preliminary consideration to bidding, but did not ultimately formally indicate an interest in bidding.

Of the 10 nations that had expressed formal interest, many withdrew their candidacy in early 2009. Jamaica was the first to withdraw its candidacy. Russia withdrew in February 2009 to concentrate on bidding for the 2013 Rugby World Cup Sevens, Australia and Ireland withdrew in spring 2009 due to financial reasons. Scotland withdrew in April 2009 after they were unable to secure co-hosting partners for the tournament. Wales was the last nation to officially pull out after they failed to submit a bid by 8 May 2009, but Wales backed England's bid and some games were played at Cardiff's Millennium Stadium.

Final bids
The final nations that bid for the right to host the 2015 Rugby World Cup were England, Japan, South Africa and Italy. Four confirmed bids was a record number for the Rugby World Cup.

On 28 July 2009, the IRB confirmed that England would host the 2015 Rugby World Cup, and Japan would host the 2019 event, having voted 16–10 in favour of approving the recommendation from Rugby World Cup Ltd (RWCL) that England and Japan should be named hosts. RWCL chairman Bernard Lapasset revealed the result on 28 July 2009 at IRB headquarters.

England
In September 2007, The Guardian reported that the Rugby Football Union had decided to submit a bid. BBC News reported in February 2009 that the intent was for a solo bid from the RFU, but with the possibility of some matches being played in Scotland, Wales or Ireland. It was hoped that the 2015 World Cup would add to Britain's "Decade of Sport" (including the 2012 Summer Olympics, 2013 Rugby League World Cup and 2014 Commonwealth Games).

It was also claimed that the bid had a very strong chance of success due to the IRB's belief that the 2011 tournament might make a loss, therefore making it particularly important to ensure a profit, which was considered a strong point of England's proposed bid. The chief executive of the Rugby Football Union, Francis Baron, said that the tournament would target sales of 3 million tickets. England's package was projected to generate £300 million for the IRB – £220 million in commercial returns from broadcasting, sponsorship and merchandising, and the £80 million tournament fee.

Italy
Italy stated its desire to host, and an Italian bid to host the Rugby World Cup in 2015 or 2019 was confirmed on 20 July 2008. Italy declared that it wanted to host "For the Enlargement of the Frontiers of Our Sport". It was a slogan relevant to the then-current landscape of World Cup rugby, given that 2007 was the first time that the Rugby World Cup was hosted by a primarily non-English-speaking country.

The Italian bid offered the largest cities and stadiums in the country and promised a fast domestic train system. The Italian Rugby Federation (FIR) also included the importance of the population and the growth of rugby since Italy joined the Six Nations in 2000 as reasons for hosting a World Cup. Rugby had been growing increasingly popular in Italy in recent years, with improved crowds at international matches.

The Stadio Olimpico in Rome had been proposed as the venue to host the final and the first match of the tournament. Milan and Naples were included as the other large venues. The entire list was a selection of large stadiums spread across the country. Stade Vélodrome in Marseille, France was also included as the tenth proposed venue.

Japan

The Japan Rugby Football Union officially submitted its tender to the IRB in May 2009. Japan was seen as a favourite to host after finishing as runner-up in the bidding for the 2011 event. Japan was seen as having a lot to offer rugby's growth in Asia. Its population of 127 million, its large economy, and its ability to place rugby before a new Asian audience made it a front-runner for hosting rights. Furthermore, rugby in Japan had developed a following, and with 126,000 registered players, Japan had more players than some of the Six Nations. Japan's Top League was a showcase for Japanese rugby, and there was excitement about Japan's entry into the RWC. Japan's experience in co-hosting the 2002 FIFA World Cup was also seen as a boost, with Japan already possessing the necessary stadiums and infrastructure.

South Africa
The South African Rugby Union (SARU) had confirmed its intent to bid for the 2015 tournament, and in May 2009 South Africa delivered its application to the IRB. South Africa had previously made an unsuccessful bid to host the 2011 RWC. The strengths of a South African bid would be that it is in the same time zone as Europe, the wealthiest television market from a rugby perspective, that South Africa were the current World Cup holders, that they had successfully hosted the 1995 Rugby World Cup, won the 2007 Rugby World Cup and that they were in the process of building large new stadiums for the then-upcoming 2010 FIFA World Cup.

Venues

After England were appointed tournament hosts on 28 July 2009, the proposed stadia for the tournament were revealed. The final venues were confirmed, along with the tournament's schedule, on 2 May 2013. Twelve of the stadia were located in England, while the Millennium Stadium located in neighbour Wales was also to be used. In 2011, the IRB approved the use of the Millennium Stadium, despite being outside of the host country, due to its capacity and strategic location. Of the thirteen venues, two were dedicated rugby union grounds (Kingsholm Stadium and Sandy Park), two were national rugby stadia (Twickenham and the Millennium Stadium), two were multi-purpose stadia (Wembley Stadium and the Olympic Stadium), and the remainder were association football grounds.

Proposed venues that did not make the final selection were the Stadium of Light in Sunderland, Coventry's Ricoh Arena, St Mary's Stadium in Southampton, Pride Park Stadium in Derby, Anfield in Liverpool and Bristol's Ashton Gate. In April 2013, Old Trafford was withdrawn from consideration by its owners, Manchester United F.C., citing commitments to hosting rugby league and its Super League Grand Final and concerns about pitch degradation. The RWCL then approached neighbouring Manchester City about leasing their home stadium as a replacement. City agreed to let their stadium be used for the tournament but only for one match due to footballing commitments – down from the original three which were to be played at Old Trafford. Etihad Stadium, as it was known for football sponsorship purposes, would be called 'Manchester City Stadium' by organisers for the duration of the tournament.

Source: The Telegraph

Team bases
The 41 venues that acted as bases for the teams were announced on 26 August 2014. All prospective team bases were subject to a rigorous selection process, which included a programme of detailed site visits as well as liaison with the competing teams. Each team base included an outdoor and indoor training facility, a swimming pool, gym and hotel and would be used by the competing teams in the lead up to and during the World Cup.

Qualifying

Of the 20 teams competing at the 2015 World Cup, 12 of them qualified by finishing in the top three places in their pools in the 2011 Rugby World Cup. The other eight teams qualified through regional competition. As the host nation, England qualified automatically. The qualification process for the remaining teams incorporated existing regional competitions such as the European Nations Cup.

Qualified teams
Twenty teams played in the final tournament. They are listed below, along with their pre-tournament positions in the World Rugby Rankings. The list of teams was the same as in the 2003 tournament.

Asia Rugby (1)
  (13)
Rugby Africa (2)
  (3)
  (20)
Sudamérica Rugby (2)
  (8)
  (19)
NACRA (2)
  (18)
  (15)

Rugby Europe (8)
  (4)
  (7)
  (16)
  (6)
  (14)
  (17)
  (10)
  (5)

Oceania Rugby (5)
  (2)
  (9)
  (1)
  (12)
  (11)

Draw
Seedings for the pools of the 2015 World Cup were based on the teams' respective IRB Rankings. The draw, hosted by Will Greenwood, was conducted on 3 December 2012 in London, and used the World Rankings as of that day, just after the 2012 end-of-year rugby union internationals, which finished on 1 December 2012. The 12 automatic qualifiers from 2011 were allocated to their respective bands based on their rankings:

 Band 1, made up of the top 4 automatic qualifiers, (1–4)
 Band 2, made up of the next 4 automatic qualifiers, (5–8)
 Band 3, made up of the next 4 automatic qualifiers (9–12)

The remaining 8 qualifying places were allocated to Bands 4 and 5, based on previous World Cup playing strength;

 Band 4, made up of Oceania 1, Europe 1, Asia 1 and Americas 1
 Band 5, made up of Africa 1, Europe 2, Americas 2 and play-off winner

This meant the 20 teams, qualified and qualifiers, were seeded thus:

The draw saw a representative randomly draw a ball from a pot, the first drawn ball goes to Pool A, the second Pool B, the third Pool C and the fourth Pool D. The draw began with Pot 5, drawn by All Blacks captain Richie McCaw, followed by Pot 4, drawn by RWC 2015 Ambassador and English women's international Maggie Alphonsi, then Pot 3, drawn by Mayor of London Boris Johnson, Pot 2, drawn by the then Chief Executive for RWC 2015 Debbie Jevans, and finally Pot 1, drawn by IRB chairman Bernard Lapasset.

Draw criticism
The timing of the draw drew criticism due to the long period between the draw occurring and the commencement of the tournament – three years. Indeed, by the time of the pool match between England and Wales on 26 September, pool A contained the 2nd, 3rd and 4th (Australia, England and Wales) ranked teams in the world. Following England's elimination at the pool stage after defeats by Australia and Wales, Wales coach Warren Gatland noted that "Everyone is making a thing about the first home country to hold a World Cup to miss out on the quarter-finals, but the stupid thing, as we all know, is why was the World Cup draw done three years ago? That's just ridiculous as far as I am concerned. If they had followed the football model, then we wouldn't be in this position. There are other people outside this who need to have a look at themselves and why those decisions were made, and you have got to feel sorry for the people involved and who this has affected". The chief executive of World Rugby Brett Gosper subsequently acknowledged criticisms, saying "We’ll look at that next time to see if it’s possible to make the draw closer to the tournament".

Squads

Each country was allowed a squad of 31 players for the tournament. These squads were to be submitted to World Rugby by a deadline of 31 August 2015. Once the squad was submitted, a player could be replaced if injured, but would not be allowed to return to the squad. There was also a stand-down period of 48 hours before the new player was allowed to take the field. Hence, a replacement player called into a squad on the eve of a game would not be permitted to play in that game.

Opening ceremony
The opening ceremony of the 2015 Rugby World Cup took place at Twickenham Stadium in London on 18 September 2015 at 19:20 (BST). The ceremony told the legend of how William Webb Ellis created the sport of rugby union, and featured the choir of Rugby School singing "Swing Low, Sweet Chariot", an anthem of rugby union in England. All the participating teams were represented by a former player in the ceremony; the host nation, England, was represented by World Cup-winning captain Martin Johnson. The ceremony was directed by Kim Gavin, who was also responsible for directing the closing ceremonies of both the 2012 Summer Olympics and the 2012 Summer Paralympics. Prince Harry, Duke of Sussex, who had an acting part previously in the ceremony, declared the tournament officially open, ending his speech with the words, "We're ready. Game on." British Prime Minister David Cameron said on social media that the 2015 Rugby World Cup would be the best ever.

Pool stage
The first round, or pool stage, saw the 20 teams divided into four pools of five teams, using the same format that was used in 2003, 2007, and 2011. Each pool was a single round-robin of ten games, in which each team played one match against each of the other teams in the same pool. Teams were awarded four points for a win, two points for a draw and none for a defeat. A team scoring four tries in one match scored a bonus point, as did a team that lost by fewer than eight points.

The teams finishing in the top two of each pool would advance to the quarter-finals. The top three teams of each pool received automatic qualification to the 2019 Rugby World Cup (Japan had already automatically qualified as hosts).	

Tie-breaking criteria
If two or more teams were tied on match points, the following tiebreakers would apply:

 The winner of the match between the two teams;
 Difference between points scored for and points scored against in all pool matches;
 Difference between tries scored for and tries scored against in all pool matches;
 Points scored in all pool matches;
 Most tries scored in all pool matches;
 Official World Rugby Rankings as of 12 October 2015.

If three teams were tied on points, the above criteria would be used to decide first place in the Pool, and then the criteria would be used again (starting from criteria 1) to decide second place in the Pool.

Pld = Number of games played; W = Number of games won; D = Number of games drawn; L = Number of games lost; TF = Number of tries scored (tries for); PF = Number of points scored in the game (points for); PA = Number of points scored against the team (points against); +/– = Points difference, PF–PA; BP = Bonus (pool) points; Pts = Total number of (pool) points.

Pool A

Pool B

Pool C

Pool D

Knockout stage

Quarter-finals

Semi-finals

Bronze final

Final

Awards
At the 2015 World Rugby Awards, Japan's game-winning final try against South Africa was named the best match moment of the tournament. A dream team was named made up of the best performing players of the tournament.

2015 Rugby World Cup dream team

Statistics

The tournament's top point scorer was Argentine fly-half Nicolás Sánchez, who scored 97 points. 
New Zealand wing Julian Savea scored the most tries, eight, equalling the record for one tournament set by his compatriot Jonah Lomu and South African Bryan Habana.

Match officials
World Rugby named the following twelve referees, seven assistant referees and four television match officials to handle the pool stage games:

Referees
 Wayne Barnes (England)
 George Clancy (Ireland)
 JP Doyle (England)
 Jérôme Garcès (France)
 Pascal Gaüzère (France)
 Glen Jackson (New Zealand)
 Craig Joubert (South Africa)
 John Lacey (Ireland)
 Nigel Owens (Wales)
 Jaco Peyper (South Africa)
 Romain Poite (France)
 Chris Pollock (New Zealand)

Assistant referees
 Federico Anselmi (Argentina)
 Stuart Berry (South Africa)
 Mike Fraser (New Zealand)
 Angus Gardner (Australia)
 Leighton Hodges (Wales)
 Marius Mitrea (Italy)
 Mathieu Raynal (France)

Television match officials
 George Ayoub (Australia)
 Graham Hughes (England)
 Ben Skeen (New Zealand)
 Shaun Veldsman (South Africa)

Media coverage
ITV Sport was the UK and worldwide host broadcaster for the 2015 event, having signed a deal in 2011 to broadcast the 2011 and 2015 RWC tournaments. ITV won the rights after outbidding rivals including the BBC and Sky Sports. It showed every match from the tournament live in the UK on ITV or ITV4.

1 Except British Indian Ocean Territory – Chagos Archipelago, Cape Verde, Chad, Democratic Republic of Congo, Djibouti, Mauritania, Mauritius, Mayotte, North Africa, Réunion, Somalia, South Sudan and Tristan da Cunha
2 Except Belize
3 Except Brazil and South Georgia and South Sandwich Islands

Video game
The officially licensed Rugby World Cup 2015 video game was released on 4 September 2015 on PC, PS3, PS4, PS Vita, Xbox 360 and Xbox One. IGN rated the game 1.5/10, calling it "unbearable to play".

Tickets
Ticket prices were announced in November 2013 with general sale applications launching in September 2014. Adult ticket prices started at £15 for pool matches and children's tickets were available from £7 at 41 of the 48 matches. Tickets for the final ranged from £150 to £715.

See also
2015 Rugby World Cup warm-up matches

Notes

References

External links

2015 RWC official website (Archived)
World Rugby – official site

 
2015
2015–16 in English rugby union
2015–16 in Welsh rugby union
2015 rugby union tournaments for national teams
International rugby union competitions hosted by Wales
International rugby union competitions hosted by England
Rugby World Cup 2015
Rugby World Cup 2015